Pourang, ( also spelled Poorang ) is a Persian given name commonly used in Iran, Kurdistan, Azerbaijan, Afghanistan, Pakistan and other countries under Persian culture influence. The word Pourang means: The Son of Color. "Pour"(son) + "Rang"(color).

See also

Pakistani masculine given names
Persian masculine given names
Masculine
Masculine given names